Social Tables is a global SaaS company headquartered in Washington, DC that was founded in 2011 by Dan Berger and Matthew Tendler. With a focus to “inspire face-to-face experiences by empowering those who plan and attend them,” the company has created a collaborative web-based event planning platform. The technology includes three-dimensional floor plans where host venues and event organizers can build rooms to position items needed for the event at hand.

Social Tables has 120 employees and 5,500 customers in 100 countries. Over 4.5 million events have been planned inside the Social Tables event technology. Major clients include Intercontinental Hotels Group, Hyatt Hotels, and Goldman Sachs.

History
Social Tables has raised $8M in a Series A funding round led by Bessemer Venture Partners and Thayer Ventures, and $13MM in a Series B funding round led by QuestMark Partners. Social Tables was acquired by Cvent for $100m on October 16, 2018.

Recognition
In 2015, the company was named one of The Washington Post's, “Top Places to Work”.  Social Tables was recognized by Deloitte as one of the 2018 Technology Fast 500 Winners, meaning they were one of the 500 fastest growing technology companies in North America. In January 2016, Social Tables moved to a new 30,000 square foot office located in Washington, DC's Metro Center. Social Tables has dedicated 10,000 square feet of its headquarters to holding events for the DC community.

References

External links
 Why This Founder Doesn't Like Describing Himself as an 'Entrepreneur' 
 District-based Social Tables collects $8M investment 
 The Washington Post Top Workplaces 2015
 District startup Social Tables ups its game with big new space
 Social Tables Opens New 30,000 Square Foot Office in DC 
 Social Tables Takes the DC Tech Lead
 ISES names 2013 Esprit winners 
 Social Tables CEO Discusses Entrepreneurship, Managing Millennials
 Network Before You Network With Social Tables

Companies based in Washington, D.C.
Companies established in 2011